Intelligence and Violence is an album by Inner City Posse, self-released by Violent J (Joseph Bruce, Insane Clown Posse) and "D-Lyrical" in 1989.

Production

The recording group consisted of Joseph Bruce and D-Lyrical, who Bruce later recalled barely knowing and only working with him for his karaoke machine.

The entire album was recorded on a karaoke machine in D-Lyrical's basement.
 Cassettes of the album were handed out for free.
The music for the tracks were taken from contemporary groups who included instrumentals on the B-sides of their cassettes.

D-Lyrical represented the Intelligence aspect of the album, while Violent J represented the Violence.

Tracks
 "Intro" - 2:04
 "Intelligence & Violence" - 3:34
 "Wizard of Delray" - 4:05
 "Violent J's The Mack" - 4:02
 "Gangsta Codes" - 6:57
 "Inner City Posse" (Interlude) - 1:31
 "Gangsta Times"  - 3:31
 "Somethin' To Say" - 4:56
 "Violent Crimes"  - 7:22
 "D-Day" - 2:41

Samples 

Intro
 "Give Da Drummer Some More" by Word

Intelligence & Violence
 "Keep On Movin'" by Soul II Soul

Wizard of Delray

 "Homicide 'N Rhyme" by D-Love

Violent J's The Mack
 "Let's Jam (Slow Jam)" by B.O.S.E

Gangsta Codes'

 "The Bay" by D-Love

Gangsta Times
 "It's All About Me" by D-Nice

Somethin' To Say
 "Peace" by E.M.S. & The Posse

D-Day
 "Homicide 'N Rhyme" by D-Love

References

Self-released albums
Insane Clown Posse EPs
1989 EPs
Gangsta rap EPs